WCWP (88.1 FM) is a college radio station licensed to Brookville, New York, owned and operated by Long Island University and broadcasting a variety radio format. The station serves the Nassau County, New York area, and is located on the C.W. Post Campus of LIU.

History 
In the spring of 1960, Arthur Beltrone '63 and Theatre Arts Professor Virgil Jackson Lee founded WCWP as a closed circuit radio station.  The Radio Club of C.W. Post College was initiated at this time. WCWP first signed on the air at noon, October 18, 1961.  Two years later, plans were made to extend the station's reach through a noncommercial, educational FM station. In January 1965, WCWP acquired new facilities, which were named after Mr. Benjamin Abrams, a pioneer in the communications industry.

On November 30, 1970, WCWP was ordered to be closed down at 2 AM by Dean Julian Mates “to protect our station license” after obscenities had been broadcast. The shutdown came at the end of the station's regular program schedule that day.

References

External links 
 

 WCWP 50th Anniversary — LIU School of Visual and Performing Arts

CWP
CWP
Mass media in Nassau County, New York
Long Island University
Radio stations established in 1961
1961 establishments in New York (state)